SRC is the eponymous debut studio album by SRC, released in November 1968 on Capitol Records. This would be the only album that Robin Dale would play on as he left shortly after this album was released.

Track listing
All songs by SRC.

 "Black Sheep" – 4:42
 "Daystar" – 4:27
 "Exile" – 4:21
 "Marionette" – 4:00
 "Onesimpletask" – 5:34
 "Paragon Council" – 3:58
 "Refugeve" – 3:37
 "Interval" – 5:12

Bonus tracks
The 1993 One Way Records CD added bonus tracks:
<LI> "Morning Mood" (Edvard Grieg, arranged by SRC) – 3:05
<LI> "Black Sheep" (single '45' version) – 3:49

Personnel
 Scott Richardson – lead vocals
 Gary Quackenbush – lead guitar
 Steve Lyman - rhythm guitar, backing vocals
 Glenn Quackenbush – Hammond organ
 Robin Dale – bass, backing vocals
 E.G. Clawson (Scott Williamson)– drums

1968 debut albums
SRC (band) albums
Capitol Records albums
Psychedelic rock albums by American artists